Kleitoria is a village and a municipal unit in Achaea, Peloponnese, Greece. It was also the new name of the former municipality Lefkasio, of which it was the seat, between 2008 and 2011. Since the 2011 local government reform it is part of the municipality Kalavryta, and became a municipal unit of this municipality. The municipal unit has an area of 253.221 km2. The site of the ancient city of Cleitor is nearby.

Subdivisions
The municipal unit Kleitoria is subdivided into the following communities (constituent villages in brackets):
Agios Nikolaos
Ano Kleitoria
Armpounas (Armpounas, Kalamaki)
Drymos (Drymos, Kato Drymos)
Filia (Filia, Agioi Theodoroi, Kalyvia, Zevgolatio)
Glastra (Agios Vlasios, Glastra)
Kastelli
Kastria
Kleitor
Kleitoria (Kleitoria, Valtos, Elatofyto, Zarelia, Kallithea)
Krinofyta
Lefkasio
Lykouria (Lykouria, Kerasia, Spilia)
Pankrati (Pankrati, Pankrataiika Kalyvia, Sella, Steno)
Planitero
Tourlada

Historical population

References

Populated places in Achaea